The National Prize for Plastic Arts was created in Chile in 1992 under Law 19169 as one of the replacements of the National Prize of Art. It is granted "to the person who has distinguished himself by his achievements in the respective area of the arts" (Article 8 of the aforementioned law). It is part of the National Prize of Chile.

The prize, which is awarded every two years, consists of a diploma, the sum of 6,576,457 pesos which is adjusted every year, according to the previous year's consumer price index, and a pension of 20  (approximately US$1,600).

Winners
 1993, Sergio Montecinos Montalva
 1995, Lily Garafulic
 1997, 
 1999, José Balmes
 2001, 
 2003, 
 2005, 
 2007, 
 2009, 
 2011, Gracia Barrios
 2013, Alfredo Jaar
 2015, Roser Bru
 2017, Paz Errázuriz

References

1992 establishments in Chile
Awards established in 1992
Arts awards
Chilean awards
1992 in Chilean law